Kurilohadalia is a genus of sea snails, marine gastropod mollusks in the family Pseudomelatomidae.

Species
Species within the genus Kurilohadalia include:

 Kurilohadalia brevis Sysoev & Kantor, 1986
 Kurilohadalia elongata Sysoev & Kantor, 1986

References

 
Gastropod genera